Thethmar, also known as Theodemar, was a Premonstratensian canon and missionary. A contemporary and friend of St. Vicelinus, he worked to convert the Wends, a tribe in modern Germany.

Notes

German Roman Catholic saints
12th-century Christian saints
1152 deaths
Premonstratensians
Year of birth unknown